Rhizophagus is a genus of beetles in the family Monotomidae, containing the following species:

 Rhizophagus aeneus Richter, 1820
 Rhizophagus approximatus LeConte, 1866
 Rhizophagus atticus Tozer, 1968
 Rhizophagus beasoni Sen Gupta & De, 1988
 Rhizophagus bipustulatus (Fabricius, 1792)
 Rhizophagus brancsiki Reitter, 1905
 Rhizophagus brunneus Horn, 1879
 Rhizophagus championi Sen Gupta & De, 1988
 Rhizophagus cribratus (Gyllenhal, 1827)
 Rhizophagus cylindricus Stephens, 1830
 Rhizophagus depressus (Fabricius, 1792)
 Rhizophagus dimidiatus Mannerheim, 1843
 Rhizophagus dispar (Paykull, 1800)
 Rhizophagus ferrugineus (Paykull, 1800)
 Rhizophagus galbus Bousquet, 1990
 Rhizophagus ghumus Sen Gupta & De, 1988
 Rhizophagus grandis Gyllenhal, 1827
 Rhizophagus grouvellei Méquignon, 1913
 Rhizophagus indicus (Méquignon, 1913)
 Rhizophagus intermedius Apfelbeck, 1916
 Rhizophagus japonicus Reitter, 1884
 Rhizophagus kali Sen Gupta & De, 1988
 Rhizophagus lineatus Sen Gupta & De, 1988
 Rhizophagus longiceps Casey, 1916
 Rhizophagus microps Jelínek, 1984
 Rhizophagus minutus Mannerheim, 1853
 Rhizophagus nitidulus (Fabricius, 1798)
 Rhizophagus nobilis (Lewis, 1893)
 Rhizophagus oblongicollis Blatch & Horner, 1892
 Rhizophagus pahalgamus Sen Gupta & Biswas, 1977
 Rhizophagus paralellicollis Gyllenhal, 1827
 Rhizophagus parviceps Reitter, 1884
 Rhizophagus parvulus (Paykull, 1800)
 Rhizophagus perforatus Erichson, 1845
 Rhizophagus picipes (Olivier, 1790)
 Rhizophagus pratapi Sen Gupta & De, 1988
 Rhizophagus procerus Casey, 1884
 Rhizophagus protensus Reitter, 1890
 Rhizophagus pseudobrunneus Bousquet, 1990
 Rhizophagus puncticollis (Sahlberg, 1837)
 Rhizophagus pusillus Bousquet, 1990
 Rhizophagus remotus LeConte, 1866
 Rhizophagus rufus Stephens, 1830
 Rhizophagus sayi Schaeffer, 1913
 Rhizophagus sculpturatus Mannerheim, 1842
 Rhizophagus similaris Reitter, 1876
 Rhizophagus simplex Reitter, 1884
 Rhizophagus singularis Sen Gupta & De, 1988
 Rhizophagus subtilis Reitter, 1872
 Rhizophagus subvillosus Reitter, 1884
 Rhizophagus suturalis Jelinek, 1965
 Rhizophagus unicolor (Lucas, 1846)
 Rhizophagus ussuriensis Nikitsky, 1984

References

Monotomidae
Cucujoidea genera